Sigma Gamma Rho Sorority, Inc. is a historically African American sorority, international collegiate, and non-profit community service organization that was founded on November 12, 1922, by seven educators on the Irvington campus (1875–1928) of Butler University in Indianapolis, Indiana. It was incorporated within Indiana in November 1922 and became a national collegiate sorority on December 30, 1929, when a charter was granted to the Alpha chapter. Sigma Gamma Rho is the only sorority of the four historically African American National Pan-Hellenic Council sororities established at a predominantly white institution instead of at Howard University. The sorority's slogan is "Greater Service, Greater Progress".

Sigma Gamma Rho has over 100,000 members with more than 500 undergraduate and alumnae chapters in the United States, Bermuda, The Bahamas, Canada, Germany, South Korea, U.S. Virgin Islands and the United Arab Emirates.

Sigma Gamma Rho has affiliate groups for women at different stages in life: Rhosebuds (elementary-age girls), the Rhoer Club Affiliates (teenage girls), and the Philos Affiliates (friends of the sorority). It has launched programs such as Sigma Teen Towns in the 1940s and formed partnerships with the March of Dimes, USA Swimming and others.

History
Sigma Gamma Rho Sorority, Inc. was organized on November 12, 1922, in Indianapolis, Indiana, by seven young educators: Mary Lou Allison Gardner Little, Dorothy Hanley Whiteside, Vivian Irene White Marbury, Nannie Mae Gahn Johnson, Hattie Mae Annette Dulin Redford, Bessie Mae Downey Rhoades Martin, and Cubena McClure. The group became an incorporated national collegiate sorority on December 30, 1929, when a charter was granted to the Alpha chapter at Butler University. Since its inception, the dynamic women of Sigma Gamma Rho have built and sustained a well-known and well-respected reputation for leading positive change to help uplift the community through sisterhood, leadership, and service.

Sigma Gamma Rho has welcomed more than 100,000 collegiate and professional women from every profession. The sorority has more than 500 chapters in the United States, Bahamas, Bermuda, Canada, Germany, South Korea, U.S. Virgin Islands, and the United Arab Emirates. The organization also has active affiliate groups devoted to empowering women at different stages in life. The Rhoer Club Affiliates (teenage girls) and Philos Affiliates (friends of the sorority) also assist alumnae chapters with various service efforts and programs.

Sigma Gamma Rho’s commitment to service is expressed in its slogan, “Greater Service, Greater Progress.” The sorority has a proud history of providing positive and proactive community outreach nationally and internationally. The programs, partnerships, and sponsorships represent Sigma Gamma Rho’s commitment to promoting the greater good in education, service, and leadership development. In 2004, the National Headquarters moved from Chicago, Illinois to its current home in Cary, North Carolina. Sigma women are dedicated to helping each other and their personal success is recognized in The AURORA and through various awards. 

In 2022 the Sorority held their Centennial Celebration at Butler University in Indianapolis, Indiana. In partnership with the Indiana Historical Bureau, the Sorority dedicated a historical marker outside of the Bona Thompson Memorial Center in Irvington, Indiana, where the Sorority began.

International Grand Basileus 
Listed below are the International Grand Basilei since the inception of the sorority on the campus of Butler University. An asterisk (*) denotes a deceased person.

 Mary Lou Allison Gardner Little* (1922–1925; acting 1925 to 1926)
 Edith Marlone Ward* (1926–1927)
 Fannie O’Bannon* (1927–1931)
 Edythe Roache Walker* (1931–1934)
 Bertha Black Rhoda* (1934–1944)
 Ethel Ross Smith* (1944–1948)
 Sallie Edwards Johnson* (1948–1954)
 Edna Douglas* (1954–1959)
 Dr. Lorraine A. Williams* (1959–1962)
 Dr. Cleo Surry Higgins (1962–1963)
 Annie Lee Whitehead Neville* (1963–1967)
 Dr. Lorraine A. Williams* (1967–1971)
 Dr. Annie Lawrence-Brown (1971–1976)
 Evelyn Hood (1976–1980)
 Dr. Alice M. Swain* (1980–1984)
 Rejesta V. Perry* (1984–1988)
 Dr. Katie Kinnard White (1988–1992)
 Corine J. Green* (1992–1996)
 Dr. LaRona J. Morris* (1996–2000)
 Helen J. Owens (2000–2004)
 Dr. Mynora J. Bryant (2004–2008)
 Joann Loveless (2008–2012)
 Bonita M. Herring (2012–2016)
 Deborah Catchings-Smith (2016–2020)
 Rasheeda S. Liberty (2020–present)

Affiliates

Philos  
Since its inception, Sigma Gamma Rho has promoted unity among women and for years many alumnae chapters worked with individuals who were not members of Greek-lettered organizations. These women were organized into auxiliaries that had various names until 1954 when the sorority officially approved the organized affiliate group and accepted the name of "Philo" (meaning, "friend") as their official name.

In 1980, the Philos were organized on a national level and have grown to represent hundreds of women organized on a regional level as well. The Philos have contributed countless hours of community service and thousands of dollars to aid Sigma Gamma Rho's aim to enhance the quality of life within every community.

Rhoers 
The Rhoer Club is an affiliate of Sigma Gamma Rho Sorority, Inc. The Rhoer Club consists of a diverse group of young ladies between the ages of twelve and eighteen who demonstrate high scholastic standards. Rhoer Clubs are organized, maintained, and sponsored by local graduate chapters within each of the geographical regions of the Sorority.

The program consists of training and guidance in education, community service, vocation, fine arts, and social affairs. The program also provides the young women with the energy, support, commitment, and encouragement of the Sorors of Sigma Gamma Rho Sorority, Inc. to help them develop and succeed in their life’s endeavors.

Rhosebuds 
The Rhosebud Club is an affiliate group consisting of a diverse group of girls ages 8 through 11 years of age.  Delicate like the petals of a rosebud, this affiliate group is handled with special care and attention.

The local chapters of Sigma seek to play a role in helping to cultivate girls as they grow into young ladies who are well-rounded and will embody the qualities needed to be good students and productive citizens.

National Programs

Operation BigBookBag
Operation BigBookBag is a program designed to address the needs, challenges and issues that face school-aged children who are educationally at-risk, in local homeless shelters and extended-care hospitals and facilities. Through this program, chapters and members collect and donate educational materials, equipment and school supplies.

Women’s Wellness Initiative
The Women’s Wellness Initiative is a consolidated effort that allows chapters to focus on health issues that impact women; specifically, women of color. The Women’s Wellness Initiative was developed after the Sorority’s participation in the United Nations/March of Dimes Prematurity Awareness panel in New York. Acceptable educational and programmatic efforts under this Initiative include, but are not limited to Breast Cancer Awareness, Intimate and Domestic Violence, Heart Health, Diabetes Health, Mental Health and other issues that target women. WWI programs can be conducted at any time during the sorority year.

Swim 1922
Swim 1922 was created to address the unfortunate truth that according to the CDC, approximately 10 people drown every day in the U.S.A. An even more startling fact is that 70 percent of African American children and 60 percent of Hispanic children in the U.S. do not know how to swim. Additionally, African American children are three times more likely to drown than Caucasian children. Through the partnership with USA Swimming, Sigma Gamma Rho’s Swim 1922 campaign aims to address this disparity by having. Olympians and members of the sorority teach the community about water safety and how to swim. With USA Swimming, Sigma Gamma Rho has touched close to 20,000 lives, directly, with the projection of changing multiple generations to come. Swim 1922 programs are conducted during May-August of the sorority year.

Project CRADLE Care
Sigma Gamma Rho Sorority’s Project CRADLE Care is one of the essential programs designed to raise awareness of disparate and inequitable maternal and infant health outcomes Black women endure through community outreach, advocacy, education, and implicit bias training. In so doing, Sigma aim to mitigate outcome and life-course disparities in our communities.

Through Project CRADLE Care, Sigma Gamma Rho Sorority, Inc. and the March of Dimes collaborate to address the issues that adversely affect Black women and their children ranging from chronic physiological stressors and underlying health conditions to structural racism and implicit biases in our healthcare system.

Annual Youth Symposium
	Held simultaneously, on the second Saturday of March by Alumnae Chapters across the nation, our Youth Symposium serves as a unifying effort during Sigma Week. The Symposium (supported by undergraduate chapters and affiliates) is designed to highlight some of the prevalent concerns that negatively impact our youth (drugs, teen violence, abuse, low self-esteem, suicide, teen pregnancy, human trafficking, etc.).

Hazing controversies 
The New York Times wrote about two hazing incidents involving the sorority. In 2008, a pledge at San Jose State University filed a civil suit against the sorority after being severely beaten, harassed, and threatened to keep the abuse a secret. Four sorority members were arrested and served 90 days in county jail. In 2010, at Rutgers University, six Sigma Gamma Rho women were arrested and charged with a felony after striking one pledge over 200 times which forced her to seek medical attention.

In March 2022, the sorority was expelled from Bowling Green State University following reports of "severe hazing"; the sorority committed at least six policy violations of the BGSU Code of Student Conduct including aggravated assault and forcing pledges to steal alcohol and marijuana.

Notable members 
Aisha N. Braveboy - former Maryland state delegate, state's attorney for Prince Georges County
Gwen Cherry - 1st African American female to serve on the State Legislator in Florida, educator, lawyer, author, Florida House Representative
Nina Turner - Former Ohio state senator
Wendy Raquel Robinson - Actress, Producer and co-founder of Amazing Grace Conservatory
MC Lyte - The first solo rapper to release her own, full-length album. Actress, Entrepreneur and Philanthropist. Co Founder of the Hip Hop Sisters Foundation.
Fantasia Monique Barrino-Taylor - Known professionally by her mononym Fantasia, is an American R&B singer and actress. She rose to fame as the winner of the third season of the reality television series American Idol in 2004.
Deshauna Barber-Miss USA 2016
Nichole "Nicci" Gilbert- R&B Singer, Founding Member of Brownstone
 Arin Jackson- R&B Singer, Member of Brownstone
 Teisha Brown- R&B Singer, Member of Brownstone
 Marsha Ambrosius- English R&B Singer and Songwriter
 Ezinma- Violinist, Model, Music Educator and Film composer
 Kelly Price- 9x Grammy nominated R&B and gospel singer
 Maranda Curtis- Gospel Singer and Praise and Worship Leader 
  Alexis Jones- Grammy Nominated Singer and Actress
  Tonya Edwards- Retired Professional Basketball Player and current assistant coach of the Chicago Sky 
  Barbara Lee-  U.S. representative for California's 13th congressional district, former chair of the Congressional Black Caucus and vice chair and a founding member of the Congressional LGBTQ+ Equality Caucus.
 Rebecca Roberts-  Curator of Programming at Planet Word, and was formerly an American journalist.
 Hattie McDaniel- American actress, singer-songwriter, and comedian. The first African American to win an Oscar
 Jekalyn Carr- Gospel Singer, speaker, entrepreneur, actress, and author.
 Robin Kelly- American politician from Illinois who has served as the U.S. representative from Illinois's 2nd congressional district 
 Lisa Price- Founder of Carol's Daughter multi-cultural beauty brand. 
 Georgia Davis Powers-American politician who served for 21 years as a state senator in the Kentucky Senate
 Carmelita Jeter- retired American sprinter, known as the Fastest Woman Alive, who competed in the 60 metres, 100 m and 200 m. he is also a three-time Olympic medallist.
 Hydeia Broadbent- United-States-based HIV/AIDS activist
 Carolyn Tyler Guidry-  bishop of the African Methodist Episcopal Church was the first woman appointed to be a presiding elder in the Fifth Episcopal District of the AME Church and the second woman to become a bishop in the denomination.
 Marilyn McCoo- Singer, Actress, and Television Presenter
 Maritza Correia- the first African-American woman to make the U.S. Olympic swim team and medal 
 Gwen Cherry- the 1st black woman to serve in the Florida state legislature. 1st black woman to practice law in Dade County, FL
 Vanessa Bell Armstrong- Four-time Grammy-nominated gospel Singer
 Maysa Leak- Jazz singer. Known for solo work and work with the band Incognito
 Sandra Bland- Activist. Her death following a traffic stop invigorated the Black Lives Matter movement.
 Renee Powell- A PGA Hall of Fame golfer. 2nd black woman to compete on the LPGA Tour. 1st woman of color elected to the membership in the PGA of America in 1996.
 Yolett McPhee-McCuin - Head coach of Ole Miss Rebels women's basketball.
 Alice Allison Dunnigan- 1st African-American female journalist credentialed to cover the White House in 1948. She was honored with a life-sized statue in the Newseum museum in Washington , DC in 2018
 Myeisha Taylor-Her work helping young people enter the field of medicine earned her the namesake of Doc McStuffins' mother on the hit Disney series.
 Lindy Boggs- 1st woman from Louisiana elected to Congress in 1973.  1st woman to chair the Democratic National Convention
 Mary T. Washington- 1st African-American CPA
 Dame Mary Eugenia Charles- 1st woman to hold the position of Prime minister of Dominica (1980-1995)
 Anna Maria Horsford- Actress 
 Ellia English- singer, dancer, stage and film actress.

References

External links

National Pan-Hellenic Council
Student societies in the United States
African-American fraternities and sororities
International student societies
Fraternities and sororities in the United States
Women's rights organizations
1922 establishments in Indiana
Student organizations established in 1922